Acompus is a genus of true bugs belonging to the family Rhyparochromidae.

The genus was first described by Fieber in 1861.

The species of this genus are found in Europe.

Species:
 Acompus laticeps Ribaut, 1929
 Acompus pallipes (G.H.W.Herrich-Schaeffer, 1835)
 Acompus rufipes (Wolff, 1802)

References

Rhyparochromidae